Justynów may refer to the following places:
Justynów, Łódź East County in Łódź Voivodeship (central Poland)
Justynów, Piotrków County in Łódź Voivodeship (central Poland)
Justynów, Sochaczew County in Masovian Voivodeship (east-central Poland)
Justynów, Sokołów County in Masovian Voivodeship (east-central Poland)